Mario movie may refer to:

Films based on Super Mario
 Super Mario Bros.: The Great Mission to Rescue Princess Peach!, a 1986 film
 Super Mario Bros. (film), a 1993 live-action film
 The Super Mario Bros. Movie, a 2023 computer animated film

Other
 Mario (1984 film), a Quebec drama film
 Mario (2018 film), a Swiss romantic drama film